Saint Dennis may refer to:

 Saint Denis of Paris, Christian saint
 St Dennis, Cornwall, a village in England
St Dennis Junction, a railway station
 St. Dennis, Louisville, a place in Kentucky, United States

See also
 Saint Denis (disambiguation)
 Saint Denise (disambiguation)
 St Denys, a place in England